The Big C is a Showtime original series created by Darlene Hunt and starring Laura Linney. She plays a reserved, fortysomething, suburban wife and mother whose recent cancer diagnosis forces her to shake up her life and find hope, humor and the light side of a dark situation, while managing her immature but well-meaning husband, played by Oliver Platt.

A total of 40 episodes of The Big C were aired over four seasons, between August 16, 2010, and May 20, 2013.

Series overview 
The runtime was 27-minutes for seasons 1 through 3, and one-hour for season 4. In syndication, season 4 was recut into half-hour episodes (identified as part 1 and part 2).

Episodes

Season 1 (2010)

Season 2 (2011)

Season 3 (2012)

Season 4: Hereafter (2013)

References

External links 
 
 

Lists of American comedy television series episodes